is a Japanese manga series written and illustrated by Akane Shimizu. It features the anthropomorphized cells of a human body, with the two main protagonists being a red blood cell and a white blood cell she frequently encounters. It was serialized in Kodansha's shōnen manga magazine Monthly Shōnen Sirius from January 2015 to January 2021. It is licensed in North America by Kodansha USA. A spin-off manga series, Cells at Work! Code Black, was published from 2018 to 2021.

The series has been adapted into an anime television series by David Production, with two seasons broadcast from July 2018 to February 2021, totaling 21 episodes. A theatrical anime titled "Hataraku Saibō!!" Saikyō no Teki, Futatabi. Karada no Naka wa "Chō" Ōsawagi! premiered in September 2020.

Plot
The story takes place inside the human body, where trillions of anthropomorphic cells each do their job to keep the body healthy. The series largely focuses on two such cells; a rookie red blood cell, AE3803, who often gets lost during deliveries, and a relentless white blood cell, U-1146, who fights against any germs that invade the body.

Characters

A red blood cell who has just started her job, delivering oxygen, carbon dioxide and different nutrients all over the body. She meets Neutrophil when he saves her from an attacking pneumococcus bacterium. She is clumsy and gets lost often, but is determined to perform to the best of her ability. It is later revealed that she had encountered Neutrophil when they were younger, after he saved her from a bacterium.
 / 

 A type of white blood cell, whose job is to kill pathogens infecting the body. Despite his violent and ruthless occupation, he's quite soft-spoken and gentle. When he was still in school as a young cell, he saved AE3803 from a bacterium after she got lost in a training exercise.

 A type of white blood cell that recognizes and kills various foreign matter and unhealthy cells. He is aggressive, cocky and rowdy, brutally taking pleasure in slaughtering pathogens and unhealthy cells. He especially looks down on white blood cells forming relationships with non-white blood cells, like Neutrophil's close friendship with Red Blood Cell. He is the sergeant of the Killer T Cells and is a harsh teacher to his students, the Naive T Cells. He has negative relationships with Helper T Cell and NK Cell, the former being his superior in the Killer T Division. In his youth, he was considered to be weak like the rest of the young T Cells, being only able to survive and complete training through the help of Helper T Cell, which at least made him stronger.
 / 

 A type of white blood cell. She and her kind appear as lovely maids in big dresses, armed with a variety of large weapons to fight various invasive pathogens, and are often shown smiling cheerfully even in the middle of combat. While inside blood vessels, she and her kind take on the role of monocytes, and wear hazmat suits over their dresses.

 A type of cell responsible for reconstructing the body after various injuries. They are depicted as children, due to their small cell size, and act as construction and repair crew within the body. One platelet who carries a whistle on her neck serves as their leader and she is most prominently featured in the show, while a secondary yet shy platelet known as "Backward Cap" because she wears her cap backwards, also appears in the story.

 A type of T Cell that determines strategy and courses of action for dealing with foreign invaders. He is the main commander of the Killer T Division and has an intellectual and smooth disposition, putting him at big odds with the rough and tough Killer T Cell, despite having undergone T Cell training together with him.

 A type of T Cell that mediates and regulates the correct function and magnitude of immunological responses. She usually acts as Helper T Cell's secretary, though she is capable of fighting when necessary. She went through T Cell training alongside Killer T Cell and Helper T Cell.

 
 A rookie T Cell who is too frightened to fight invasive microorganisms, until Dendritic Cell helps him transform into Effector T Cell. He and his kind are the students of Killer T Cell, from whom they receive harsh treatment and austere training.

 
 A Naive T Cell transformed into a large, muscular and powerful T Cell.

 A type of white blood cell who is acquainted with White Blood Cell since they grew up in the same bone marrow. She feels inferior to the other immune cells because of her inability to fight off bacteria and viruses, but she shows her true worth by killing a parasitic Anisakis when the other cells could not. She handles a bident as her weapon of choice.

 Depicted as a messenger dressed in green stationed inside a call center resembling a tree. He can stimulate Naive T Cells and transform them into Effector T Cells. He owns a camera which he always uses to take pictures of events he deems important and stores them in picture albums, some of which are sources of shame and humiliation for the other cells.

 A paranoid and neurotic cell whose job is to remember past infections and allergies so that the immunity system can be ready for them. However, he is scatterbrained and it is difficult for him to sort out his memories, often panicking and screaming whenever disaster strikes.

 A cell whose job is to monitor and release histamines in response to allergic and inflammatory reactions. She always follows the instructions in her book no matter the situations and is unpopular due to her lack of consideration of what her actions do to the other cells. Also known as "Fat Cell", she gets irked whenever she is referred to with that name.

 An older red blood cell who sometimes guides and teaches AE3803 on how to properly perform her occupation.

 A young but overly serious red blood cell who becomes AE3803's student.

 A white blood cell who carries a weapon that shoots antibodies. He is often annoyed and jealous about not receiving as much credit as the Killer T Cells do. He also has an antagonistic relationship with Mast Cell, as their combined functions only cause grave disasters for the other cells.

 A mysterious and poetic character whose real occupation is unknown, appearing during a food-borne infection to make cryptic commentaries on the disastrous events unfolding.

She patrols the whole body for viruses, bacteria and abnormal cells, with her weapon of choice being a machete. She has a smug demeanor, is somewhat condescending towards other cells and her relationship with Killer T Cell is akin to that of an intense sibling rivalry.

 An antagonistic cell bent on creating a world where cells no longer have to kill each other, even if it means risking the life of the body.

 Normal Cell is a minor character who plays a major role in season 2. Normal Cell is a soft-hearted troublemaker. He finds his job of copying himself boring hence he began to venture outside of his apartment to explore or mess around. Despite not being able to do anything, he has a strong will to protect someone that is precious to him (Lactic Acid Bacteria). According to AE3803, he lives by the pharynx, which happens to be an area that contains lymph nodes.

Media

Manga
Cells at Work! is written and illustrated by Akane Shimizu. It was serialized in Kodansha's shōnen manga magazine Monthly Shōnen Sirius from January 26, 2015, to January 26, 2021. Kodansha has collected the manga into five tankōbon volumes .

Kodansha USA announced that it had licensed Cells at Work! in North America on March 21, 2016. The manga is also licensed in Taiwan by Tong Li Publishing. Kodansha USA also announced that it has licensed Cells at Work! Code Black. Kodansha USA has also licensed five other spin-offs Cells at Work!: Bacteria!, Cells at Work!: Platelets! and Cells at Work!: Baby!, Cells at Work! Neo Bacteria, and Cells at Work! White Brigade.

Spin-offs
The manga received a spin-off in the May 2017 issue of Nakayoshi called Cells at Work!: Bacteria! ("Bacteria at Work") by Haruyuki Yoshida, which follows the lives of good and bad bacteria in the intestines. On June 3, 2020, it was announced that Cells at Work!: Bacteria! would end on July 3, 2020. A sequel series, titled Cells at Work! Neo Bacteria, began serialization on Nakayoshi and the Palcy manga app in February 2021.

Another spin-off, titled Cells NOT at Work! ("Cells That Don't Work") by Moe Sugimoto, about immature red blood cells (erythroblasts) that do not want to work, was launched in the September 2017 issue of Monthly Shōnen Sirius. It published its final chapter on November 26, 2021.

The manga received another spin-off titled , set in a "black" environment of a human body suffering an unhealthy lifestyle, that runs in Weekly Morning since June 7, 2018. It is written by Shigemitsu Harada, with illustrations by Issei Hatsuyoshi and supervision by Shimizu.

The manga received another spin-off titled Cells at Work and Friends! ("Cells at Work! Friend"), which centers around a Killer T Cell who is normally strict with himself and others, but wants to have fun during his free time. He also wants to make friends but does not want to ruin his reputation. The series began running in Bessatsu Friend on January 12, 2019. It is written by Kanna Kurono, and illustrated by Mio Izumi. It concluded on April 13, 2021.

Another spin-off series focusing on the platelet characters, titled  written by Kanna Kurono and illustrated by Mio Izumi, began serialization in the June issue of Monthly Shōnen Sirius that was released on May 25, 2019. It concluded on April 26, 2021.

Another spin-off series focusing cells inside the body of a baby 40 weeks since conception and nearing delivery, with the cells knowing nothing, titled  illustrated by Yasuhiro Fukuda, was launched in the 45th issue of Weekly Morning on October 17, 2019. It concluded on October 7, 2021.

Another spin-off series focusing on cells in the body of an adult woman, titled  written by Harada and illustrated by Akari Otokawa, was launched in the March issue of Monthly Morning Two on January 22, 2020.

Another spin-off series focusing on white blood cells, titled  illustrated by Tetsuji Kanie, was launched in the December issue of Monthly Shōnen Sirius, which was released in October 2020. The series ended serialization on July 26, 2022.

Another spin-off series, titled Cells at Work!: Illegal written and illustrated by Kae Hashimoto, began serialization in Kodansha's YanMaga Web digital manga platform on February 1, 2022.

Another spin-off series focusing on muscles in the human body, titled Cells at Work! Muscle written and illustrated by Yū Maeda will begin serialization on the Morning Two manga website on February 16, 2023.

Volume list
Cells at Work!

Cells at Work!: Bacteria!

Cells NOT at Work!

Cells at Work and Friends!

Cells at Work!: Platelets!

Cells at Work!: Baby!

Cells at Work!: Lady!

Cells at Work!: White Brigade

Cells at Work!: Neo Bacteria!

Cells at Work!: Illegal

Anime
An anime television series adaptation was announced in January 2018. It is directed by Kenichi Suzuki and animated by David Production, with scripts written by Suzuki and Yūko Kakihara, and character designs by Takahiko Yoshida. The series' music is composed by Kenichiro Suehiro and MAYUKO. The anime series premiered on July 8, 2018, on Tokyo MX and other channels. The series ran for 13 episodes. Aniplex of America licensed the series in North America and simulcast it on Crunchyroll. Madman Entertainment simulcasted Australia and New Zealand on AnimeLab, while Muse Communication licensed the series in Southeast Asia and South Asia, and simulcasted it on Animax Asia. MVM Entertainment acquired the series for distribution in the United Kingdom and Ireland. A special episode premiered on December 27, 2018. Aniplex of America released the English dub on August 27, 2019.

On March 23, 2019, the official Twitter account announced that the series will receive a second season. The second season aired from January 9 to February 27, 2021. The main staff at David Production is returning for producing the second season, with the exception of director Kenichi Suzuki being replaced by director Hirofumi Ogura.  The opening theme is "Go! Go! Saibō Festa!" by the main cast members, while the ending theme is "Fight!!" by ClariS.

A theatrical anime titled "Hataraku Saibō!!" Saikyō no Teki, Futatabi. Karada no Naka wa "Chō" Ōsawagi! was announced on July 4, 2020, as an advanced screening of episodes 4–8 later aired in the second season. Also shown with a short animation "Kesshouban: Eigakan e Iku". The main staff at David Production returned for producing the film, with the exception of director Kenichi Suzuki being replaced by director Hirofumi Ogura. It premiered on September 5, 2020.

Cells at Work

Cells at Work!!

Light novel
It is written by Yui Tokiumi and illustrated by Akane Shimizu.

Stage play
A stage play adaptation titled  was announced in the August issue of Kodansha's Monthly Shōnen Sirius magazine. The play was held at Tokyo's Theatre 1010 from November 16 to 25, 2018. The play which was directed by Tsuyoshi Kida, starred Masanari Wada as U-1146 and Kanon Nanaki as AE3803, while Keita Kawajiri wrote the script for the play. The last performance, which was held on the 25th, was also distributed live.

Mobile app
A tower-defense game for iOS and Android mobile devices titled  has been announced and is accepting pre-registration for players. The game service shut down at January 31, 2020.

Live-action film
A live-action film adaptation was announced by Kodansha and Flag Pictures on March 20, 2023. It will be directed by Hideki Takeuchi and the script of which will be written by Yuichi Tokunaga.

Reception
Rebecca Silverman of Anime News Network highlighted the educational aspect of the manga despite flaws in presentation of information, and ultimately found the manga entertaining with likable characters. Sean Gaffney of Manga Bookshelf called it a "very fun shonen action manga", complimenting the manga's ridiculousness and humor. Ian Wolf of Anime UK News gave the British Blu-ray release of the anime a score of 9 out of 10, and described the show as the most bloody on television, because so many of the characters are blood cells and thus means it contains more blood than shows depicting much violence.

The 2016 Kono Manga ga Sugoi! guidebook listed the manga as the seventh top manga for male readers. Paul Gravett included the manga in his list of "Top 22 Comics, Graphic Novels & Manga" for October 2016. , the manga had over 1.3 million copies in print. The manga had over 1.5 million copies in print, .

Dr. Satoru Otsuka, postdoctoral fellow in the molecular neuro-oncology department of Emory University School of Medicine in Atlanta, Georgia, praised the series' depiction of cancer cells during the series' seventh episode. Biology teachers at a high school affiliated with China's Southwest University were so impressed with the accuracy of the series that they assigned it as homework for their students.

See also
 Osmosis Jones, a 2001 American live-action/animated action comedy film and its spin-off television series, Ozzy & Drix, both of which feature a similar premise
 Once Upon a Time... Life'', a 1987 French animated series with a similar premise

Notes

References

External links
  
  
  
   
 

2015 manga
2018 Japanese novels
2021 anime television series debuts
Anime series based on manga
Aniplex
Anthropomorphism
Comedy anime and manga
Comics adapted into plays
David Production
Fantasy anime and manga
Educational comics
Human body in popular culture
Japanese webcomics
Kodansha manga
Light novels
Medical anime and manga
Muse Communication
Plays based on comics
Science education television series
Seinen manga
Shōjo manga
Shōnen manga